Emo Philips (born Philip Soltanec February 7, 1956) is an American actor, stand-up comedian, writer and producer. His stand-up comedy persona makes use of paraprosdokians spoken in a wandering falsetto tone of voice. The confused, childlike delivery of his material produces the intended comic timing in a manner invoking the "wisdom of children" or the idiot savant.

Career 
The character of Emo Philips is widely known for his unique look and on-stage antics, appearing as a fidgety, possibly mentally disturbed, nervous but highly intelligent individual with an obsession for coleslaw. Philips constantly moves throughout the routine, often shifting from sitting to standing positions, wandering from end to end on stage, playing with his hair or clothing, or going as far as to partially undress as he delivers punchlines. His comedy, which is largely self-deprecating and ironic, is often delivered in a modulated falsetto. His look (occasionally described as geeky, disco and vaudeville-inspired), particularly his hair—a 1970s-style bob with straight-lined front fringe—has been a signature part of his appearance and act for most of his career.

Philips has recorded three comedy albums. His album E=mo², recorded live at Caroline's in Manhattan, New York City, won the 1985 New Music Award for best comedy album. It was later re-released along with his Live at the Hasty Pudding Theatre album on a single CD. He also released an album called Emo in 2001. A joke of his was voted funniest religious joke ever in a 2005 online poll. In 2006, he appeared at the Newbury Comedy Festival. He was included in the top 50 of E4s 100 Greatest Comedians, and also appeared number 54 on Channel 4's top 100 greatest standups.

Aside from Philips's long career as a standup comic, he has been featured in acting roles on television series such as Miami Vice and The Weird Al Show. In 2006, he appeared on British television, as a guest on the panel game 8 Out of 10 Cats. Philips has several voiceover credits, including work on the animated series Dr. Katz, Professional Therapist; Home Movies; Space Ghost Coast to Coast; Adventure Time as Cuber the mysterious storyteller; and the voice of Dooper in the animated series Slacker Cats. Philips has also appeared on 4 episodes of @midnight, in February 2015, April 8, 2016, a 1990s themed episode on September 26, 2016, and the finale episode on August 4, 2017.

He has appeared in feature films including 1989's UHF (as Joe Earley, a rather clumsy school shop teacher who accidentally saws his thumb off) and Desperation Boulevard in 1998. Additionally, he appeared in the original 1992 version of Meet the Parents (also executive producer) and was an associate producer of the 2000 remake.

Around 2001, Philips began to appear more often after a hiatus in the 1990s. His look was drastically altered, appearing more "new millennium" rather than his signature bob and 1970s casual disco look. Now embracing salt & pepper spiked up grey hair and dressed in black active sportswear, Philips delivered the same comedy routine but with a much more subdued persona. Though still fidgety, Philips no longer carried random props or undressed himself as he used to. Like most of the Reagan era comedians, Philips felt the need to adapt to changing times and styles of the flourishing digital age in an effort to stay relevant to younger audiences, particularly later year Generation X and millennials who comprised the majority of college populations during the early part of the 2000s.

Philips only carried this appearance for a few years, retiring it in 2005 and emerging back on the comedy circuit around 2010 with his classic look and persona. He has experienced a considerable resurgence in popularity since then and has been a featured performer at many national comedy tours over the last several years, appearing at the Moontower Comedy Festival in Austin, Texas, and appearing frequently on 24/7 Comedy.

"Weird Al" Yankovic and Philips toured together throughout the US in 2018, in Yankovic's Ridiculously Self-Indulgent, Ill-Advised Vanity Tour, and again in the 2022 iteration.
In 2011, Emo married actress and screenwriter Kipleigh Brown.

Discography 
 1985: E=mo² 
 1987: Live at the Hasty Pudding Theatre
 2001: Emo
 2003: E=mo² plus the Entire Live at the Hasty Pudding Theatre

Filmography

Films

Television

Video games

References

External links 

 
 1988 KCRW radio interview "Bob Claster's Funny Stuff" with performance excerpts

1956 births
20th-century American male actors
American male comedians
Living people
People from Downers Grove, Illinois
American male film actors
Male actors from Illinois
21st-century American male actors
American stand-up comedians
Comedians from Illinois
20th-century American comedians
21st-century American comedians